Robert Lloyd Duncan (born August 5, 1953) is an American attorney and politician who served as the fourth chancellor of the Texas Tech University System, serving from 2014 to 2018. A Republican, he previously served as a member of both houses of the Texas State Legislature.

Duncan served in the Texas State Senate from the 28th district, centered about Lubbock, from 1996, when he won a special election, until his resignation in July 2014, when he was named chancellor of the Texas Tech system. He previously served in the Texas House of Representatives from District 84 from his election in 1992 until 1996. On May 19, 2014, the Texas Tech University System Board of Regents named Duncan the sole finalist to succeed former U.S. Representative Kent Hance as the system chancellor.

Early life and education

Duncan is the only son of the five children of Frank L. Duncan, a district conservationist for the U.S. Department of Agriculture in Vernon, and the former Robena Formby. Duncan holds bachelor's and law degrees from Texas Tech University.

Career 
Duncan practices law and is a partner at the Lubbock firm of Crenshaw Dupree & Milam, L.L.P. Duncan, along with colleagues Bob Deuell of Greenville, John Carona of Dallas, Kevin Eltife of Tyler, and Kel Seliger of Amarillo, is considered one of the most liberal of the nineteen (as of 2013) Texas Senate Republicans, according to an analysis by Mark P. Jones of the Political Science Department at Rice University in Houston. Jones also found that these Republicans saw passage of 90 percent of the bills for which they had voted. In the 2014 primaries, Carona was narrowly defeated, and Deuell narrowly lost a runoff election with fellow Republican Bob Hall.

Personal life 
Duncan is married to the former Terri Patterson. He has two children from his first marriage to the former Lynne Stebbins, Lindsey and Matthew Duncan.

Election history

Senate election history of Duncan.

Most recent election

2004

Previous elections

2002

1998

1996

References

External links
Texas Tech profile
Project Vote Smart - Senator Robert L. Duncan (TX) profile
Follow the Money - Robert L. Duncan
2006 2004 2002 1998 campaign contributions

1953 births
Chancellors of the Texas Tech University System
Living people
People from Vernon, Texas
People from Lubbock, Texas
Texas Tech University alumni
Texas Tech University School of Law alumni
Texas lawyers
Republican Party members of the Texas House of Representatives
Republican Party Texas state senators
Presidents pro tempore of the Texas Senate
21st-century American politicians